The latitudinally equal-differential polyconic projection (等差分纬线多圆锥投影) is a polyconic map projection in use since 1963 in mainland China. Maps on this projection are produced by China's State Bureau of Surveying and Mapping and other publishers. Its original method of construction has not been preserved, but a mathematical approximation has been published.

Description 
As a polyconic projection, the parallels are arcs of circles that are not concentric. The points of no distortion are on the central meridian at 44°N/S latitude. Meridians are convex away from the straight central meridian, and parallels are gently concave away from the equator. The projection is neither equal-area nor conformal; rather, it is a compromise projection.

Maps on this projection do not show the north pole, instead cropping the high latitudes along a straight line whose latitude varies but that never reaches the pole. By convention, the projection is centered at 150° such that the Pacific Ocean dominates the center-right of the map and China is placed about 45° west of the central meridian, in a location favorable for low distortion. Greenland is split at the left and right edges of the map, and the northern edge of the map clips the highest regions of the island.

See also 

 List of map projections
 Winkel tripel projection, which has similar characteristics.

References

External links 
Archive of Chinese world map on the latitudinally equal-differential polyconic projection

Map projections